The 2009 European Team Judo Championships were held at the Miskolc Sports Hall in Miskolc, Hungary on 3 October 2009.

Medal summary
Medal summary is as follows:

References

External links
 

 
 Team
WC 2009
European Team Judo Championships
Judo
European 2009
Judo
Judo